Charles Livingston Grimes (July 9, 1935 – February 5, 2007) was an American competition rower and Olympic champion.

Early life
Born in Washington, D.C., Grimes was the son of Charles Pennebaker Grimes and Louise Davis Ireland Grimes. He was prepared at Groton School. He graduated from Yale University in 1957 and had an LL.B. from Harvard Law.

He played varsity football and basketball at Yale. Grimes accelerated his four-year course of study, graduating half way through his senior year.  He attended Christ Church, Oxford, for one year after Yale.

Career
Grimes competed at the 1956 Summer Olympics in Melbourne, where he won a gold medal in eights with the American rowing team.

Grimes was physically imposing and powered the 1956 gold medal Olympic crew in Melbourne where he pulled so much water on his side that there was a problem balancing the boat. That team was the last university team to bring home the gold.

Later life
"Grimes graduated from Yale in 1957 and from Harvard Law School in 1960. After a brief law career, he worked as an independent financial advisor and investor."

Grimes was also the plaintiff in the Grimes v. Donald, 673 A.2d 1207 (Del. 1996), one of the landmark Delaware corporations cases.

His wife Jane Brown Grimes is the second female Chairperson and President of the USTA. They had three children.

References

External links
 

1935 births
2007 deaths
Sportspeople from Washington, D.C.
Groton School alumni
Yale University alumni
Harvard Law School alumni
Olympic gold medalists for the United States in rowing
Rowers at the 1956 Summer Olympics
American male rowers
Medalists at the 1956 Summer Olympics